NGC 101 is a spiral galaxy estimated to be about 150 million light-years away in the constellation of Sculptor. It was discovered by John Herschel in 1834 and its magnitude is 12.8.   It is a member of the Southern Supercluster (also called the Laniakea Supercluster) the closest galaxy supercluster to the Local Supercluster.

Notes

References

External links
 

0101
001518
Intermediate spiral galaxies
Sculptor (constellation)
Astronomical objects discovered in 1834
Discoveries by John Herschel